Yulia Yuryevna Bravikova (born 17 July 1999) is a retired Russian individual rhythmic gymnast. She is the 2017 Grand Prix Final All-around champion. On the junior level, she is the 2014 European Junior hoop champion and a two-time (2013, 2014) Russian Junior National All-around champion.

Career

Junior
Bravikova began appearing in international junior competitions in the 2011 Season, she competed in her first junior nationals at the 2012 Russian Junior Championships finishing 12th in all-around behind Arina Averina. she competed in junior division at the 2012 Aeon Cup and won the silver medal in all-around behind Katsiaryna Halkina of Belarus.

In 2013 Season, Bravikova started her season winning the 2013 Russian Junior Championships scoring ahead of Aleksandra Soldatova. She won the junior all-around titles at the 2013 Moscow Grand Prix and  2013 Bucharest World Cup. On October 25–27, Bravikova competed at the World Club Championship, the 2013 Aeon Cup in Tokyo, Japan representing team Gazprom where she won the junior all-around division and (together with Senior teammates Yana Kudryavtseva and Margarita Mamun) and won the team gold. She culminated her successful season winning the junior all-around title at the 2013 Gymnasiade held in Brasilia, Brazil.

In 2014 Season, Bravikova repeated as Russian Junior National champion. She won the all-around gold at the 2014 Moscow Grand Prix. She continued her success winning gold in Team and apparatus finals in the 2014 World Cup series in Debrecen, Pesaro. On June 10–16, Bravikova competed at the 2014 European Junior Championships and together with teammates (Veronika Polyakova, Irina Annenkova and Olesya Petrova) won Russia the Team gold. She qualified to 1 event final and won gold in hoop. In early July, Bravikova suffered a leg injury, she stayed in hospital was discharged 2 days later. She then was withdrawn from the entry list for Russia at the 2014 Youth Olympics and was replaced by Irina Annenkova.

Senior 
In 2015, after spending last season recovering form her surgery; Bravikova appeared as Define Hors concours (Out of Competition, her scores were not counted, e.g.: appearing only for an Exhibition) at the 2015 World Cup Final in Kazan. Early of the 2016 season, Bravikova underwent another surgical operation to correct her injury rehabilitation, she returned to competition at the 2016 Russian Championships finishing 10th in the all-around. She switched coaches later in that year and began training under former World All-around silver medalist Daria Kondakova.

In 2017 season, after struggling for 2 years with injuries, Bravikova returned to the international scene at the Grand Prix competition in Moscow finishing 7th in the all-around, she qualified to 1 apparatus final and won a silver medal in clubs behind Dina Averina. On March 10–12, Bravikova competed at the 2017 Russian Championships finishing 6th in the all-around. On March 17–19, Bravikova won the all-around silver medal at the Grand Prix Kiev, she qualified to 3 event finals taking silver in hoop and 2 gold medals in clubs, ribbon. On her next Grand Prix, Bravikova along with teammate Dina Averina competed at the 2017 Thiais Grand Prix where she won gold in ribbon, silver in clubs, hoop and bronze in ball and in the all-around. On March 31 - April 2, Bravikova won the all-around bronze at the 2017 Grand Prix Marbella behind teammate Arina Averina, she qualified to a apparatus final taking silver in hoop and finished 8th in ribbon. On May 12–14, Bravikova competed at the 2017 Portimao World Cup where she won the all-around gold medal ahead of teammate Elizaveta Lugovskikh, she also qualified all apparatus finals taking silver medals in hoop, clubs, a bronze in ribbon and 4th in ball. On June 22–26, Bravikova competed at the 2017 Holon Grand Prix taking bronze in the all-around behind Dina Averina, she qualified to 3 apparatus finals and won gold medals in clubs, hoop and bronze in ribbon. On July 7–9, Bravikova competed at the World Challenge Cup at the 2017 World Cup Berlin where she won silver in the all-around behind Belarusian Katsiaryna Halkina. She qualified to all apparatus finals taking gold in clubs, silver in ribbon, and finished 4th in ball and hoop. On August 5–7, Bravikova finished 4th in the all-around, just out of a medal behind Belarus' Katsiaryna Halkina at the 2017 Minsk World Challenge Cup, however she qualified in 2 apparatus finals and won gold in both events. On August 9, during the control training selection process for the 2017 Summer Universiade, Bravikova and Ekaterina Selezneva were selected to represent Russia in the rhythmic gymnastics universiade participants. On August 27–29, she won the all-around gold at the 2017 Summer Universiade in Taipei, in the apparatus finals: she won gold in hoop, clubs, ribbon and silver in ball.

In 2018, Bravikova began her season at the 2018 Grand Prix Moscow, where she won all-around bronze behind the Averinas. She qualified in one apparatus final, but withdrew due to a leg injury. In November 2018, she announced her stress fracture caused retirement.

Routine music information

Competitive Highlights

References

External links

 
 

1999 births
Living people
Sportspeople from Oryol
Russian rhythmic gymnasts
Universiade medalists in gymnastics
Universiade gold medalists for Russia
Universiade silver medalists for Russia
Medalists at the 2017 Summer Universiade
21st-century Russian women